Louis Escallier (11 January188311 July1965) was a French businessman. He was a financial inspector and then the governor of the Banque de l'Algérie from 1934 to 1946, chairman of Crédit Lyonnais from 1946 to 1949, and then the third Chair of Électricité de France from 1949 to 1952.

Escallier was one of the senior financial officials arrested in August1943 and detained in Germany. He was deported in 13 August1943 from Compiègne to the Buchenwald concentration camp as a "Personnalité-otage"hostage-personality. On 31 August, Escallier was transferred to the Plansee subcamp of the Dachau concentration camp.

References 

1883 births
1965 deaths
French bankers
Électricité de France
Recipients of the Legion of Honour
Buchenwald concentration camp survivors